Westwallbunker  is a bunker and museum in Saarland, Germany, that was part of the Siegfried Line.

See also 
 Regelbau
 List of surviving elements of the Siegfried Line

External links
www.bunker20.de

Museums in Saarland
Siegfried Line